XHPMOC-FM is a radio station on 104.9 FM in Ciudad Cuauhtémoc, Chihuahua. It is owned by GRD Multimedia and operated by Grupo Bustillos Radio as "La Patrona" with a grupera format.

History
XHPMOC was awarded in the IFT-4 radio auction of 2017 and came to air in January 2018 with a formal inauguration in late February; the station originally was affiliated with the La Mejor format from MVS Radio.

On April 12, 2020, operation of the station transferred to Bustillos Radio, resulting in a name change and disaffiliation from MVS.

References

Radio stations in Chihuahua
Radio stations established in 2018
2018 establishments in Mexico